Maitri Pune is a volunteer non-governmental organisation based in Pune, India whose work includes helping tribals in the Melghat and Marathwada regions. Established in 1992, they have helped to lower the infant mortality rate, along with raising agricultural production and increasing AIDS awareness. In recent years they have expanded their reach to include natural disaster relief and a helpline for AIDS awareness which was receiving 1,500 calls a day as of 2009.

Notes

External links
Official website
NGO to start drive against malnutrition in Melghat The Times of India
Govt apathy main reason for backwardness in Melghat The Times of India

Health charities in India
Organisations based in Pune
Organizations established in 1992
1992 establishments in Maharashtra